Willem Leon Massyn (born ) is a South African rugby union player for the  in Super Rugby, the  in the Currie Cup and the  in the Rugby Challenge. In 2013 and 2014 he represented the Hoerskool Monument Lions in the Grant Khomo Week and Craven Week. His regular position is flanker or number eight.

References

External links
 itsrugby.co.uk profile
 

Alumni of Monument High School
South African rugby union players
Living people
1997 births
Rugby union players from Pretoria
Rugby union flankers
Golden Lions players
South Africa Under-20 international rugby union players
Lions (United Rugby Championship) players
Ealing Trailfinders Rugby Club players